Psilotagma pictaria is a moth of the family Geometridae first described by Frederic Moore in 1888. It is found in India and Nepal.

References

Moths described in 1888
Pseudoterpnini